Ludwig Crüwell (20 March 1892 – 25 September 1958) was a German army general who served in the Afrika Korps of Nazi Germany during World War II. He was a recipient of the Knight's Cross of the Iron Cross with Oak Leaves. Crüwell surrendered to the British forces on 29 May 1942 and was interned at Trent Park, the British camp for high-ranking POWs where his conversations were subject to covert surveillance.

Career
Crüwell became commander of the 11th Panzer Division in August 1940 and led it during the Invasion of Yugoslavia; he received the Knight's Cross of the Iron Cross afterwards. Then the division took part in Operation Barbarossa; he was promoted to Generalleutnant and received the Oak Leaves to his Knight's Cross.

Crüwell became commander of the Afrika Korps on 31 July 1941, under General Erwin Rommel, who on the same day took command of Panzer Army Africa, consisting of one infantry and two panzer divisions. Due to health reasons he took actual command on 15 September, and was promoted to General der Panzertruppe on 17 December 1941. On 29 May 1942, Crüwell was inspecting operations by air in Libya. His pilot mistook British troops for Italian soldiers and landed, where Crüwell was taken prisoner.

Crüwell was interned at Trent Park to the north of London, known as the "Cockfosters Cage", a Combined Services Detailed Interrogation Centre for senior officers operated by MI19 and equipped with an "M Room" listening facility to secretly record and translate the conversations of the inmates. Here, on March 22, 1943, he was intentionally placed with another POW, General Wilhelm von Thoma. During their conversation, Thoma disclosed intelligence regarding the V-2 rocket, i.e., surprise that London was not yet in ruins from German rockets being tested at Kummersdorf test grounds he had visited. This led to the British investigating Peenemünde and  following confirmation, carried out a bombing raid on the Peenemünde facilities which severely disrupted the program.

Crüwell led the pro-Nazi group of German officers at Trent park, who were outnumbered by those opposed to the regime. The British intelligence files recorded in his character profile that "he tried to impress everyone with his own importance and knowledge, a trouble-maker and a bore". In mid-1944, Crüwell was transferred to a facility in the United States.

After the war Crüwell settled in Essen. He became Chairman of the Veterans Association of the Germany Africa Corps and died on 25 September 1958.

Awards
 Iron Cross (1914) 2nd Class (20 September 1914) & 1st Class (17 September 1916)
 Clasp to the Iron Cross (1939) 2nd and 1st Class 2nd Class (22 May 1940) & 1st Class (6 June 1940)
 Knight's Cross of the Iron Cross with Oak Leaves
 Knight's Cross on 14 May 1941 as Generalmajor and commander of the 11. Panzer-Division
 34th Oak Leaves on 1 September 1941 as Generalleutnant and commander of the 11. Panzer-Division

References
Citations
Bibliography

External links
Bugging Hitler’s Soldiers  – Transcript of a PBS program, including quotations from Crüwell 

1892 births
1958 deaths
Generals of Panzer Troops
German prisoners of war in World War II held by the United Kingdom
Recipients of the Knight's Cross of the Iron Cross with Oak Leaves
Military personnel from Dortmund
German Army personnel of World War I
Recipients of the Silver Medal of Military Valor
German Army generals of World War II